

Ladislav Svante Rieger (1916–1963) was a Czechoslovak mathematician who worked in the areas of algebra, mathematical logic, and axiomatic set theory. He is considered to be the founder of mathematical logic in Czechoslovakia, having begun his work around 1957.

Notes

References

Further reading

, especially "3.5 Ladislav Rieger and lattices", pp. 238–250

External links

1916 births
1963 deaths
Czechoslovak mathematicians

Algebraists
Set theorists
Charles University alumni
Academic staff of Charles University
Czechoslovak philosophers